Pavle Branovic (870–921) was the Prince of the Serbs from 917 to 921. He was put on the throne by the Bulgarian Tsar Symeon I of Bulgaria, who had imprisoned the previous prince, Petar after he had become a Byzantine ally. Pavle ruled for four years, before being defeated by Zaharija Pribislavljević, his cousin. Pavle was the son of Bran, the middle son of Mutimir (r. 851–891) of the Vlastimirović dynasty.

Pavle was born in the 870s, between 870 and 874 to Bran Mutimirović, the middle son of Mutimir. His Christian name, in relation to the previous generation of pagan names, shows the spread Christianization of the Serbs. After Mutimir, his grandfather, died in 891, Pribislav succeeded as prince. Pribislav ruled briefly for a year when Petar returned and defeated him. Pribislav fled to Croatia with his brothers Bran (Pavle's father) and Stefan. Bran later returned and led an unsuccessful rebellion against Petar in 894. Bran was defeated, captured and blinded (as per Byzantine tradition).
 
In 917, a Byzantine army led by Leo Phokas invaded Bulgaria but was decisively defeated at the Battle of Achelous on 20 August 917. After the Achelous, Symeon sent an army to Serbia led by Pavle (after he had heard of a Byzantine–Serbian alliance), to take the Serbian throne, however, unsuccessfully as Petar proved a good opponent. Symeon then sent generals Marmais and Theodore Sigritsa, persuading Petar (through an oath) to come out and meet them, then captured and took him to Bulgaria where he was put in prison, dying within a year. Symeon put Pavle on the Serbian throne.

In 920, Zaharija, the exiled son of Pribislav (the eldest of Mutimir's sons), was sent by Romanos I Lekapenos (r. 920–944) to seize the throne. Pavle defeated and captured him, handing him over to Symeon, who held him for future use. In the meantime, Pavle switched his allegiance back to the Byzantines, prompting Symeon to dispatch Zaharija against him at the head of a Bulgarian army in 921. Zaharija won the battle but soon reaffirmed his Byzantine alliance. There are no more mentions of Pavle.

See also

Byzantine–Bulgarian war of 913–927
Bulgarian–Serbian wars of 917–924

Annotations

References

Sources 

Primary sources
 
Secondary sources

External links
 Steven Runciman, A History of the First Bulgarian Empire, London 1930.

10th-century Serbian monarchs
10th-century rulers in Europe
Vlastimirović dynasty
Eastern Orthodox monarchs
Serbian exiles
People of the Bulgarian–Serbian Wars
Christian monarchs